A timeshare is a property with a particular form of shared ownership or use rights.

Timeshare, time-share, or time share may also refer to:
 Time Share (2000 film), a television film
 Time Share (2018 film), a Mexican thriller-drama film
 Time-sharing, shared use of a computing resource
 Timeshares (band), an American rock band
 "Time Share", an episode of the sitcom The King of Queens
 "Time Share (Suite 509)", a song by Estelle from True Romance

See also
 Tymshare, a time-sharing service